The 1997–98 FIBA EuroLeague was the 41st installment of the European top-tier level professional club competition for basketball clubs (now called simply EuroLeague). It began on September 18, 1997, and ended on April 23, 1998. The competition's Final Four was held at Palau Sant Jordi, Barcelona, with Kinder Bologna defeating AEK in the EuroLeague Final, in front of 11,900 spectators.

Benetton Treviso finished in the third position, while Partizan finished fourth.

Competition system
24 teams (the national domestic league champions from the best leagues, and a variable number of other clubs from the most important national domestic leagues). The competition culminated in a Final Four.

Teams

Country ranking
For the 1997–1998 EuroLeague, the countries are allocated places according to their place on the FIBA country rankings, which takes into account their performance in European competitions from 1994–95 to 1996–97.

Note

Team allocation

First round

Second round
(The individual scores and standings of the first round are accumulated in the second round)

If one or more clubs are level on won-lost record, tiebreakers are applied in the following order:
Head-to-head record in matches between the tied clubs
Overall point difference in games between the tied clubs
Overall point difference in all group matches (first tiebreaker if tied clubs are not in the same group)
Points scored in all group matches
Sum of quotients of points scored and points allowed in each group match

Top 16

|}

Quarterfinals

|}

Final four

Semifinals
April 21, Palau Sant Jordi, Barcelona

|}

3rd place game
April 23, Palau Sant Jordi, Barcelona

|}

Final
April 23, Palau Sant Jordi, Barcelona

|}

Final standings

Awards

FIBA EuroLeague Top Scorer
  Peja Stojaković ( PAOK)

FIBA EuroLeague Final Four MVP
 Zoran Savić (Kinder Bologna)

FIBA EuroLeague Finals Top Scorer
 Antoine Rigaudeau (Kinder Bologna)

FIBA EuroLeague All-Final Four Team

References

External links
1997–98 FIBA EuroLeague
1997–98 FIBA EuroLeague
Eurobasket.com 1997–98 FIBA EuroLeague

 
1997–1998